This is a list of gliders/sailplanes of the world, (this reference lists all gliders with references, where available) 
Note: Any aircraft can glide for a short time, but gliders are designed to glide for longer.

Polish miscellaneous constructors 
 AMA Motoszybowiec
 Antykacap
 Babiński 1912 glider
 Babiński 1913 glider
 Barszczowski Glider
 Bartel 1 Glider
 Bartel 2 Glider
 Bielany School Glider
 Bilski Mewa (Gull) No.14 – Second Polish Glider Contest 17 May – 15 June 1925
 Bistrama & Puławski SL-3 No.8 – Second Polish Glider Contest 17 May – 15 June 1925
 Blaicher B-38
 Błażyński Polon – First Polish Glider Contest August 1923 – Alojzy Błażyński
 Blogoslawienstwo
 Bohatyrewa Miś (Teddy Bear) No.12 – Second Polish Glider Contest 17 May – 15 June 1925
 Bohatyrewa Motyl
 Bums glider
 Bydgoszczy Żabuś
 Chelm School Glider
 Chrzanowski School Glider
 Chrzanowskiego 1912 glider
 Chyliński HWL Pegaz – Tadeusz Chyliński
 Cywiński Lublin  – First Polish Glider Contest August 1923 – Stanisław Cywiński
 Czarnecki & Wroński Ikar
 Czechovski Śpiesz się powoli (hasten slowly) No.11 – Second Polish Glider Contest 17 May – 15 June 1925
 D.1 'Cykacz' (Ticker) – Centralne Warsztaty Lotnicze – Central Aviation workshops
 de Beaurein & John Glider
 Diana-2 – Diana Sailplanes
 Drzewiecki SL-2 Czarny Kot No.6 – Centralne Warsztaty Lotnicze – Second Polish Glider Contest 17 May – 15 June 1925
 Dubno School Glider
 Działowski Bydgoszczanka No.2 – Second Polish Glider Contest 17 May – 15 June 1925 – Dzalialowski, Stanislaw & Dzalialowski, Mieczyslaw
 Elżanowski ZE-1 Cytrynka
 Garstecki Rywal (Rival) No.17 – Second Polish Glider Contest 17 May – 15 June 1925 – Garstecki, Tadeusz
 Grodziska Mazowieckiego
 Grzmilas Orkan I (Whirlwind I) No.10 – Second Polish Glider Contest 17 May – 15 June 1925 – Grzmilas, Tadeusz
 HWL Pegaz
 Ikub 1a – KUBICH, Jan
 ITS-IVB - Nowotny
 Jach Bimbuś (Bimbo) No.3 – Second Polish Glider Contest 17 May – 15 June 1925
 Jach Żabuś (Froggy) – First Polish Glider Contest August 1923
 Janika
 Janowsky J-5 Marco – Janowski, Jaroslaw
 Janowsky J-6 Fregata – Janowski, Jaroslaw
 Jasiński & Czarnecki Czajka (Lapwing) No.15 – Second Polish Glider Contest 17 May – 15 June 1925
 Jaworski WJ 3 – Jaworski, Wiktor
 K.L.S.2 – 'Start' Aviation Circle
 K.L.S.3 – 'Start' Aviation Circle
 Karpiński 1929 glider – Karpinski, Adam
 Karpiński SL-1 Akar
 Karski 1910 Glider – Karski, Julian
 Karski 1912 Glider – Karski, Julian
 Krząkała Glider
 Kubicki Ikub I – First Polish Glider Contest August 1923
 Kućfir Pirat (Pirate) – First Polish Glider Contest August 1923
 L.O.P.P. Poznan Ikar (Icarus) (L.O.P.P. – Liga Obrony Powietrznej i Przeciwgazowej – League of Air and Anti-gas Defence)
 Lotnia Feyrala
 Luków School Glider
 Malinowski Dziaba – First Polish Glider Contest August 1923 – Malinowski, Stefan
 Marianów W-1
 Marianów WW-1
 Mechanik (glider) – J. Warczewski – (Mechanic) No.16 – Second Polish Glider Contest 17 May – 15 June 1925
 MIP Smyk
 Młody Lotnik Glider
 Motyl (glider) (Butterfly) No.20 – Second Polish Glider Contest 17 May – 15 June 1925
 Mroczkowski 1910 Glider
 Muraszew-Tomaszewski MT1
 Muszyński ZM-1 – Muszynski, Zbigniew
 Muszyński ZM-3 – Muszynski, Zbigniew
 Naleszkiewicz-Nowotny NN 1 – Nowotny, Adam & Naleszkiewicz, Jaroslaw
 Naleszkiewicz-Nowotny NN 2 – Nowotny, Adam & Naleszkiewicz, Jaroslaw
 Naleszkiewicz JN 1
 Okarmusa 1
 Okarmusa 2
 Peregrine Sailplanes KR-03 (Puchatek)
 Piotrków School glider
 Ploszajski KLS-II
 PZL 22
 Roman Szynkiewicz's Glider
 Saloni 1910 Glider – SALONI, Bronisław
 Segno 1909 glider – SEGNO, von Henryk
 Sergiusz Czerwiński's Glider
 Stanięda 1 – Emanuel Stanięda
 Stanięda 2 – Emanuel Stanięda
 Stanięda 3 – Emanuel Stanięda
 Stoerl 1911 glider
 Tański Lotnia (Tańskiego) I
 Tański Lotnia (Tańskiego) II
 Tański Lotnia (Tańskiego) III
 Tarczyński and Stępniewski TS-1/34 Promyk – Tarczynski, Tadeusz & Stepniewski, Wiesław
 Tułacz M.1 – First Polish Glider Contest August 1923 – Tulacz, Piotr
 Twist Master
 Uczniów Gymnazjum – Chrzanowski-Gymnasiums in Warszawa
 Uczniów Lwowskich 1910 Glider – Baszniak, Kazimierz & Siemiuła, Wlodzimierz & Sokalski, Aleksander
 Uczniów z Piotrkowa
 Uszacki KLS-I Młodego Lotnika – Uszacni, Antoni
 Wallisa S-I No.18 – Second Polish Glider Contest 17 May – 15 June 1925 – WALIS, Józef
 Wallisa S-III No.19 – Second Polish Glider Contest 17 May – 15 June 1925 – WALIS, Józef
 Wladyslaw W.1 – Wladyslaw Gallar – Marianów OO Warsaw High School
 Warsztaty Lotnicze Czajka - Kocjan
 Yalo Moto-Bocian – Yalo S.C. of Nowy Dwor Mazowiecki ZA Szybowiec – (ZA glider) – Związek Awiatyczny – Związek Awiatyczny (Club de l'Université Technique de Lwow)
 Zalewski W.Z.II – Zalewski, Wladyslaw & Zalewski, Boleslaw
 Zalewski W.Z.VIII'DePeŻe' – Centralne Warsztaty Lotnicze – Central Aviation workshops
 Zalewski W.Z.X – Centralne Warsztaty Lotnicze – Central Aviation workshops
 ZASPL 1913 glider -, Władysław & Tadeusz Florjańsky – Związek Awiatyczny Studentów Politechniki Lwowskiej (Club de l'Université Technique de Lwow)
 ZASPL Osa
 Zbaraż School Glider
 ZE-1 (Cytrynka'' – lemon) – 'Start' Aviation Circle
 Zygmund-Pawliczak ZP – Ludwik Zygmund & Antoni Pawliczak

Notes

Further reading

External links

Lists of glider aircraft